The Slovak Extraliga 2007–08 was the fifteenth regular season of the Slovak Extraliga, the top level of professional ice hockey in Slovakia.

Regular season

Final standings

Key - GP: Games played, W: Wins, OTW: Over time wins, OTL: Over time losses, L: Losses, GF: Goals for, GA: Goals against, PTS: Points.

Playoffs

Quarterfinals

Semifinals

Finals

Abbreviations - OT: Overtime, PS: Shootout

Playoff bracket

Scoring Leaders

Regular season

Key - GP: Games played, G: Goals, A: Assists, PTS: Points.

Playoffs

External links
 Slovak Ice Hockey Federation

2007-08
Slovak
2007–08 in European ice hockey leagues